Hong Kong Garden is Tsing Lung Tau's largest private housing estate between Sham Tseng and Tai Lam in Hong Kong. Hong Kong Garden was developed by the property developer Chinachem Group in late 1980s and built in three phases. It has 28 blocks and 2830 flats from 300 sq ft to 1400 sq ft, including The Top and Perfetto.

It is located at 100 Castle Peak Road, Tsing Lung Tau in the New Territories.

Demographics
According to the 2016 by-census, Hong Kong Garden had a population of 7,942. The median age was 42.6 and the majority of residents (89.9 per cent) were of Chinese ethnicity. The average household size was 3 people. The median monthly household income of all households (i.e. including both economically active and inactive households) was HK$45,000.

Politics
Hong Kong Garden is located in Tsuen Wan Rural constituency of the Tsuen Wan District Council. It was formerly represented by Ng Hin-lung, who was elected in the 2019 elections until July 2021.

References

External links

 Chinachem Hong Kong Garden
 Hong Kong Garden incorporated owners
 GoHome.com Hong Kong Garden

Private housing estates in Hong Kong
Tsing Lung Tau
Chinachem